Olho Marinho is a Portuguese civil parish in the municipality of Óbidos. The population in 2011 was 1,279, in an area of 18.12 km².

References

External links
Official website 

Freguesias of Óbidos, Portugal